Christian Koffi (born 21 December 1990) is an Ivorian footballer who currently plays as a midfielder for TP Mazembe of the Democratic Republic of the Congo. He has appeared in seven matches for his national team, but has yet to register a goal.

References

External links 
 TP Mazembe Profile

1990 births
Living people
Ivorian footballers
People from Dabou
Séwé Sport de San-Pédro players
TP Mazembe players
Linafoot players
Ivorian expatriate footballers
Expatriate footballers in the Democratic Republic of the Congo
Ivorian expatriate sportspeople in the Democratic Republic of the Congo
Association football midfielders
Ivory Coast international footballers